Notojapyx is a genus of diplurans in the family Japygidae.

Species
Notojapyx mjoebergi (SIlvestri, 1929)
Notojapyx tillyardi (Silvestri, 1930)

References

Diplura